Chapsa thallotrema is a species of lichen in the family Graphidaceae. Found in Panama, it was described as new to science in 2011.

References

Ostropales
Lichen species
Lichens described in 2011
Lichens of Central America
Taxa named by Robert Lücking